Isaac Jové Rubí (born 21 February 1980) is a Spanish retired footballer who played as an attacking midfielder, and is also a manager.

He amassed Segunda División totals of 227 matches and 20 goals over seven seasons, mainly in representation of Lorca Deportiva, Salamanca and Murcia (two years apiece).

Playing career
Born in Barcelona, Catalonia, Jové started his career with newly created Ciudad de Murcia, winning promotion from Tercera División in 2001. Afterwards, he was loaned to Udinese Calcio in Italy, but did not appear in one single game for the club, being posteriorly loaned to CD Logroñés.

Jové then played one season each with Lorca Deportiva CF in the Segunda División B and UD Almería in the Segunda División, returning to the former after they promoted to the second level. He was an undisputed starter in his second year, but the Murcian side were relegated.

Subsequently, Jové stayed in his country's division two, representing UD Salamanca and Real Murcia. He finished his professional career at the age of 34, after two seasons with as many teams in the Greek second tier.

Coaching career
After retiring, Jové spent two years as an assistant manager at CF Lorca Deportiva. On 8 June 2017, he was named head coach of amateurs CD Algar.

References

External links

1980 births
Living people
Spanish footballers
Footballers from Barcelona
Association football midfielders
Segunda División players
Segunda División B players
Tercera División players
Ciudad de Murcia footballers
CD Logroñés footballers
Lorca Deportiva CF footballers
UD Almería players
UD Salamanca players
Real Murcia players
Orihuela CF players
Udinese Calcio players
Football League (Greece) players
Iraklis Thessaloniki F.C. players
Niki Volos F.C. players
Spanish expatriate footballers
Expatriate footballers in Italy
Expatriate footballers in Greece
Spanish expatriate sportspeople in Italy
Spanish expatriate sportspeople in Greece
Spanish football managers
Primera Federación managers
CD Badajoz managers
Niki Volos F.C. managers
Spanish expatriate football managers
Expatriate football managers in Greece
Expatriate football managers in Panama
Spanish expatriate sportspeople in Panama